Truthfully Speaking is the debut studio album by American singer Truth Hurts. It was released on June 25, 2002 through Aftermath Entertainment and Interscope Records. Dr. Dre served as the album's executive producer.

Critical reception

Truthfully Speaking earned generally mixed reviews from music critics. BBC Music critic Emmy Perry called the album a "quality debut performance with solid production and Truth's considerable talents as a songwriter making up for the fact that few tracks match up to the originality of the first single. There is however no questioning the calibre and tone of her operatic voice, which appears to convey the harsh sound of the streets whilst keeping the church firmly in mind." Sal Cinquemani, writing for Slant Magazine, called Truthfully Speaking a "slow burner that draws on more traditional hip-hop and R&B sound structures and displays Truth’s versatile, often coquettish, vocal (think a less socially-conscious Jill Scott)."

PopMatters described Truthfully Speaking as a "a simple album filled with plenty of vocal potential but misses the mark with it's overall simplicity." AllMusic editor John Bush found that despite a "star-studded credit list, Truthfully Speaking is a bland record; Truth Hurts' vocals, while evocative and rangy, aren't incredibly strong (especially when she's stretching a note), and she usually needs a backup chorus to keep the songs sounding good [...] A few of the productions make for good tracks, though most of the time Truth Hurts struggles to keep up with the best in the contemporary R&B field."

Commercial performance 
The album debuted at five on the US Billboard 200, selling 89,000 copies. By October 2003, Truthfully Speaking had sold 338,000 copies in the United States, according to Nielsen SoundScan.

Track listing

Notes
  denotes co-producer

Sample credits
"Push Play" contains a portion of "I'm Still #1" as performed by KRS-One.
"Addictive" contains a sample from "Do It (Til You're Satisfied)" as written by Billy Nichols.

Charts

Weekly charts

Year-end charts

References 

2002 debut albums
Aftermath Entertainment albums
Albums produced by Dr. Dre
Albums produced by DJ Quik
Albums produced by Timbaland
Albums produced by Focus...
Albums produced by R. Kelly
Truth Hurts albums